Stichophthalma nourmahal (the chocolate jungle queen), is a South Asian butterfly that belongs to the Morphinae subfamily of the brush-footed butterflies family.

Distribution

The chocolate jungle queen ranges from Sikkim, Assam and Nagaland in India and also in Bhutan.

Status
Evans and Haribal report the butterfly as rare over its range.

Description

The male upperside is bright chocolate brown. Its forewing has a broad, curved, oblique preapical band from costa to termen. Its apex and termen are dark brown with a subterminal series of delicate, brown, trident-shaped marks. The hindwing hosts a yellow band along the terminal margin, bearing paired, lunular, brown marks in the interspaces. Its underside is dark ochraceous, paler towards the apex of the forewing, with transverse markings: subbasal and median dark brown sinuous lines, bordered, the former on the inside, the latter on the outside, by narrow bands of greenish blue; a discal series of obscure ocelli, some of them pale spots; a postdiscal and a subterminal dark highly-sinuous line, the former ending in a black tornal spot outwardly margined with pink. The antennae, head, thorax and abdomen are chocolate brown above, ochraceous beneath.

The female upperside is similar, with a preapical white spot on forewing. The underside has similar transverse markings. The ground colour up to the median black transverse line is chocolate-brown; beyond, the forewing from costa to vein 4 is light ochraceous, inwardly paling to white below vein 1; the hindwing is crossed by a diffuse dark brown band; ocelli as in the male, followed by a dull ochraceous-brown postdiscal area. The terminal margins are broadly brown, inwardly defined and crossed subterminally by sinuous dark lines. The antennae, head, thorax and abdomen are as in the male.

Cited references

References
 

Amathusiini
Butterflies of Asia